Marinha do Brasil Park is an urban park located in the city of Porto Alegre, the state capital of Rio Grande do Sul, Brazil. It was inaugurated on December 9, 1978, on 70,7 hectares of city-owned land. It is located in Praia de Belas neighbourhood.

Parks in Porto Alegre
Protected areas established in 1978